Hossein Kharrazi (1957 – 27 February 1987) was the commander of IRGC's 14th Imam Hussein Division during Iran–Iraq War. He supported Islamic revolution and after its victory, served and helped safeguarding it. He was engaged in many operations during the war, namely Dawn 8, in which he captured troops of Saddam's Republican Guard in al-Faw Peninsula; and in Operation Karbala-5 as the commander of the vanguard forces. Kharrazi was killed by shrapnel from a mortar bomb during Operation Karbala-5.

History
During his adolescence he was interested in religious publications. Kharrazi participated in religious congregations and learning theological subjects. His curiosity toward religious matters increased during the campaigns against the Pahlavis and he became more aware of the contemporary political circumstances. While performing his military service, Kharrazi was sent to Dhofar. He deserted the armed forces finally in 1978, according to the direction of Ruhollah Khomeini, and joined the revolutionaries.

Iran–Iraq War
His first considerable command was in Darkhovin region close to Abadan–Ahvaz road, known as "The Lion Frontier". In the battle, the Iranian troops resisted Saddam's army for 9 months. He became the commander of Darkhovin front. Kharrazi served actively in freeing Bostan afterwards. Following Operation Tarigh ol-Qods, Imam Hussein Brigade was established which soon was reorganized to a division with Kharrazi being appointed as the Major General. His troops participated in the operations Fath-ol-Mobeen and Beit ol-Moqaddas (which liberated Khorramshahr). In the later operation, his division was among the first which passed Karun river and reached Ahvaz–Khorramshahr road. As a commander he was also involved in other operations like Ramadan, Before the Dawn, Dawn 4; and Khaibar during which he lost an arm. He often reconnoitered combatant's territories himself. In Operation Dawn 8, his troops managed to defeat Saddam's Republican Guard and had victories in Al-Faw Peninsula and around "Salt Factory". During Operation Karbala-5, Kharrazi's division was the spearhead and succeeded to pass arched embankments of the combatant army. He was incredibly popular among Iranian fighters.

"Karbala-5" was his last operation. Under the heavy artillery bombardment of Saddam's forces, food supplies became critical. He took the direct responsibility of providing food. Kharrazi was a staunch adherent of Islam and the ideals of the Islamic revolution of Iran. However, senior commanders criticized him for taking towns in excess of their requests and on his own initiative. Kharrazi believed that the Iran–Iraq War could have been over in a week, had he not been held back by the Iranian command.

He was killed in action by shrapnel from a mortar bomb during battle in Operation Karbala-5 in 1987.

See also
 List of Iranian commanders in the Iran–Iraq War
 Military of Iran
 Basij

References

 The official site of Holy defense - Iraq-Iran War 1980-1988  

1957 births
1986 deaths
Iranian military personnel killed in the Iran–Iraq War
Recipients of the Order of Fath
Military personnel from Isfahan
Imperial Iranian Army conscripted personnel
Islamic Revolutionary Guard Corps personnel of the Iran–Iraq War
Iranian military personnel of the Dhofar Rebellion